The following are the members of the Dewan Undangan Negeri or state assemblies, elected in the 2018 state elections which was part of the 2018 Malaysian general elections. Also included are the list of the Sarawak state assembly members who were elected in 2016. On 24 February 2020, the Malaysian United Indigenous Party (BERSATU) and a faction of the Members of Parliament (MPs) from the People's Justice Party (PKR) led by the PKR's then-Deputy President Mohamed Azmin Ali left the governing coalition Pakatan Harapan, resulting in the collapse of the Pakatan Harapan coalition administration led by the then-Prime Minister Mahathir Mohamad.

Composition

Results of the 14th Malaysian general election (State)

Current composition

Perlis

2018–2022

2022–2023

Kedah

Kelantan

Terengganu

Penang

Perak

2018–2022

2022–2023

Pahang

2018–2022

2022–2023

Selangor

Negeri Sembilan

Malacca

2018–2021 

The following data is correct as of 5 October 2021.

2021–2023

Johor

2018–2022

The following data is correct as of 22 January 2022.

2022–2023

Sabah

2018–2020 

The following data is correct as of 24 September 2020.

2020–2023

Sarawak

2016–2021 

Following the state election that was held on 7 May 2016, Barisan Nasional was able to form the next state government with a majority of 72 seats out of 82. There were several candidates from breakaway parties such as TERAS and UPP that had their members contest seats under the Barisan banner as direct election candidates under a deal by Adenan Satem after their parties were prevented from joining Barisan after opposition from parties such as PDP and SUPP. On 12 June 2018, all Sarawak-based BN parties including Parti Pesaka Bumiputera Bersatu (PBB), Parti Rakyat Sarawak (PRS), Progressive Democratic Party (PDP) and Sarawak United People's Party (SUPP) officially left Barisan Nasional forming a new coalition Sarawak Parties Alliance due to Barisan Nasional's defeat in general elections on 9 May 2018.

2021–2023

See also
 Members of the Dewan Rakyat, 14th Malaysian Parliament

Notes

References

2018 elections in Malaysia